Agamamedli (also, Aga-Mamedly) is a village in the Saatly Rayon of Azerbaijan.

References 

Populated places in Saatly District